For the results of the Brazil national football team, see:
 Brazil national football team results (1914–1949)
 Brazil national football team results (1950–1969)
 Brazil national football team results (1970–1989)
 Brazil national football team results (1990–2009)
 Brazil national football team results (2010–present)